Sabina Kraupp (born 6 December 1986) is a Swedish curler. Kraupp plays third for team Cecilia Östlund in Karlstad and has won the Swedish Championship in 2015 and 2011. As a junior, she was alternate for the Swedish team at the 2005 World Junior Curling Championships in Pinerolo, winning a silver medal. She was also an alternate for the Swedish team at the 2010 Ford World Women's Curling Championship in Swift Current, Canada.

References

External links
 

Swedish female curlers
Living people
1986 births